Biktyshevo (Biktış) is a rural locality (a selo) in Akbarisovsky Selsoviet, Sharansky District, Bashkortostan, Russia. The population was 124 as of 2010. There are 2 streets.

Geography 
Biktyshevo is located 13 km northeast of Sharan (the district's administrative centre) by road. Bikkulovo is the nearest rural locality.

References 

Rural localities in Sharansky District